Hopewell is an unincorporated community in Marion County, Mississippi, United States. It lies at an elevation of 276 feet (84 m).

References

Unincorporated communities in Marion County, Mississippi
Unincorporated communities in Mississippi